Michael Gibbs may refer to:
 Michael Gibbs (politician) (1870–1943), Newfoundland lawyer and politician
 Michael Gibbs (composer) (born 1937), jazz composer and arranger
 Michael Gibbs (priest) (1900–1962), Dean of Cape Town and Dean of Chester
Michael Gibbs (poet) (1949–2009), British poet and visual artist